Charles Sanford Burk (April 22, 1887 – October 11, 1934) was a pitcher in Major League Baseball. He pitched from 1910 to 1915.

External links

1887 births
1934 deaths
Baseball players from Columbus, Ohio
Major League Baseball pitchers
Pittsburgh Rebels players
Brooklyn Superbas players
Brooklyn Dodgers players
St. Louis Cardinals players
Marion Moguls players
Marion Diggers players
Fort Worth Panthers players
Indianapolis Indians players
Minneapolis Millers (baseball) players
Burials at Cypress Hills National Cemetery
United States Army personnel of World War I